Phujuni (Aymara phuju spring of water, -ni a suffix, "the one with a spring", also spelled Fucuni) is a mountain in the Bolivian Andes which reaches a height of approximately . It is located in the Potosí Department, Antonio Quijarro Province, Porco Municipality. It lies northwest of K'uyka and northeast of Qullqi Chaka Punta.

References 

Mountains of Potosí Department